Naimiyeh (also Romanized as Na‘īmīyeh; also known as Na‘īmeh, Na‘īmīyeh-ye Asad Khān, and Na‘mīyeh-ye Asad Khān) is a village in the Jazireh-ye Minu Rural District, Minu District, Khorramshahr County, Khuzestan Province, Iran. According to the 2006 census, the population of Naimiyeh was 109, and was made up of 20 families.

References 

Populated places in Khorramshahr County